Andrew Wotman (born October 20, 1990), known professionally as Andrew Watt, is an American record producer, singer, songwriter, and multi-instrumentalist.

Watt's debut solo single "Ghost in My Head" reached No. 30 on the Billboard Mainstream Rock chart in 2016. Watt won the 2021 Grammy Award for Producer of the Year. He has produced albums for Justin Bieber, Miley Cyrus, Ozzy Osbourne, Pearl Jam, Iggy Pop and many others. Watt is also the guitarist of the Earthlings, the backing band for Eddie Vedder's solo performances.

Career 
Watt grew up in Great Neck, New York. He attended John L. Miller Great Neck North High School and graduated in 2008. "One of the greatest aspects of growing up in Great Neck, Long Island, was that it was literally 30 minutes from Manhattan," Watt said. His first professional gigs were playing guitar for Jared Evan, Cody Simpson, and Justin Bieber.

In 2013, Watt was a founding member and guitarist of the rock band California Breed alongside Glenn Hughes (Deep Purple, Black Sabbath) and Jason Bonham (Foreigner). In 2015, Watt recorded and released his first label EP, Ghost In My Head. Red Hot Chili Peppers' Chad Smith and Queens of the Stone Age's Joey Castillo played drums on the record.

Watt opened for Jane's Addiction in October 2015. He also opened The Cult's Los Angeles show in February 2016. In February 2016, Rolling Stone praised Watt for his vocal performance in a rendition of "L.A. Woman" performed live with Robby Krieger as part of a tribute to The Doors' Ray Manzarek.

Watt then rose to further fame as a music producer. Watt produced Ozzy Osbourne's album Ordinary Man which was released on February 21, 2020.

Watt won the Grammy Award for Producer of the Year in March 2021. He contributed to the tribute album The Metallica Blacklist, released in September 2021, by backing Miley Cyrus on a cover of the Metallica song "Nothing Else Matters".

Watt produced Eddie Vedder's 2022 solo album Earthling and will produce Pearl Jam's upcoming studio album.

Beginning in 2022, Watt became the guitarist of the Earthlings, Vedder's touring band for his solo shows. The Earthlings also feature Chad Smith on drums, Chris Chaney on bass, and Josh Klinghoffer on guitar.

Discography

Contributions and collaborations

Singles

Awards and nominations

References

External links 

 Official website

1990 births
American male singer-songwriters
Grammy Award winners
Living people
Singers from Los Angeles
Singers from New York City
Record producers from New York (state)
New York University alumni
California Breed members
21st-century American singers
21st-century American male singers
Singer-songwriters from California
Singer-songwriters from New York (state)
Blues rock musicians
American hard rock musicians
Rock and roll musicians